Gunman in the Streets (Canadian title Gangster at Bay) is a French/US-produced 1950 black-and-white film noir directed by Frank Tuttle and starring Dane Clark and Simone Signoret. Unreleased for theatrical screening in the US, the film was titled Time Running Out for its US television syndication from 1963.

The low-budget B-movie was shot on location in Paris, France. A French-language version of the film (directed by Borys Lewin) was released in France under the title Le Traque ("The Hunt").

Plot
American army deserter turned criminal on the run Eddy Roback is being chased through the streets of Paris. The fugitive finds his old girlfriend, Denise Vernon (Signoret) and tries to get money from her in an attempt to get across the border to Belgium. The girlfriend's friend, an American crime reporter (Duke), as well as a country-wide manhunt become obstacles Roback must get past in order to escape. While trying to raise him money, Denise finds him a hiding place in the studio of a lecherous photographer Max Salva, who may have turned Roback in.

Cast 

Dane Clark as Eddy Roback
Simone Signoret as Denise Vernon
Fernand Gravey as Commissioner Dufresne (as Fernand Gravet)
Robert Duke as Frank Clinton
Michel André as Max Salva

External links

1950 films
1950 crime films
French crime films
French black-and-white films
1950s English-language films
French multilingual films
Film noir
Films set in Paris
Films directed by Frank Tuttle
English-language French films
1950s multilingual films
1950s French films